Clare Perkins (born 18 August 1965) is an English actress who is known for her roles as Denise Boulter in Family Affairs and Ava Hartman in EastEnders.

Career 
Perkins' first role was as Opal in the 1991 TV film 'Hallelujah Anyhow'  in the Screen Two strand. On TV she has appeared in Family Affairs, All in the Game, Pig Heart Boy, Casualty, EastEnders, Men Behaving Badly, Big Women and Clapham Junction.

She has appeared in many theatres, such as the Royal Court, Young Vic, National Theatre and Soho Theatre.

Her film credits include Jill in the Palme d'Or-winning Ladybird, Ladybird (Ken Loach), Secrets & Lies (Mike Leigh), Bullet Boy (Saul Dibb) and 7 Lives.

Clare was part of the BBC production Pig Heart Boy, which won a Children's BAFTA for Best Drama.
Clare has worked in theatre, film, TV and radio, she has been a member of the BBC Radio Drama Company and played the character of Mel for 8 years in the World Service soap Westway.
Clare played Beverly in the acclaimed film Bullet Boy which opened the London Film Festival in 2004; she won Best Actress for this role at the Screen Nation Awards.

In 2011 she turned to performing in many radio dramas for Radio 4 including The Winter House, Landfall, Corrinne Come Back and Gone and Best Intentions. Since 2021 she has played Denise Metcalf, a veterinary nurse, in the long-running soap opera The Archers.

Clare was in two West End productions in 2019 - Emilia which transferred from The Globe, and Sweat which transferred from the Donmar Warehouse, with the consequence that at one point her face was on the front of two West End theatres simultaneously for a month, The Vaudeville and The Gielgud; it is believed that she is the only actress to achieve this.
Clare played Kerene Nagashi in the Amazon fantasy series The Wheel of Time.
She appeared in the horror film Censor, and was one of the stars of the TV comedy-drama The Outlaws.

Personal life 
She was educated at the Rose Bruford College from 1983–1985, and is the mother of Kali Perkins (who appeared in the TV programme The Undateables). She is based in Greater London.

Filmography

Film

Television

Theatre

References

External links
 

Living people
English film actresses
People from Lewisham
English television actresses
Actresses from London
English soap opera actresses
1965 births